Castle Hallberg (German: Hallbergsche Schloss) is a castle complex in the community of Fußgönheim in Rhineland-Palatinate, Germany.

Castles in Rhineland-Palatinate